Inkpen and Walbury Hills is an  biological Site of Special Scientific Interest south of Kintbury in Berkshire. The site is situated on the flanks of Walbury Hill, the highest point in Berkshire and South East England, and the adjacent Inkpen Hill. A Bronze Age cemetery of three bowl barrows on Inkpen Hill is designated a Scheduled Monument.

These hills have the largest area of unimproved chalk downland in the county and much of it is managed by sheep grazing. North facing slopes have many mosses and herbs, such as hoary plantain and germander speedwell. There are also woods and hedgerows which provide a habitat for many species of breeding birds.

References

Sites of Special Scientific Interest in Berkshire